Mount Pisgah Academy is a four-year secondary education boarding and day school located in Candler, North Carolina, United States, near Asheville.  The academy is named after the Mount Pisgah of biblical reference as well as its proximity to Mount Pisgah in the Blue Ridge Mountains.

It was founded in 1914 as a private academy, by E.C. Waller, William Steinman, and C.A. Graves with their families, and originally called the Pisgah Industrial Institute. In 1952, its ownership was transferred to the Carolina Conference of the Seventh-Day Adventist church, and it was given its present name.
It is a part of the Seventh-day Adventist education system, the world's second largest Christian school system.

The current principal at the academy is Remy Guenin.

For the 2020-2021 school year, it had an enrollment of 88 students.

Academics
The required curriculum includes classes in the following subject areas: Religion, English, Oral Communications, Social Studies, Mathematics, Science, STEM, Computer Applications, Physical Education, Health, Fine Arts, and Electives.

Electives 
Mount Pisgah Academy offers several electives, or organizations. The students are encouraged to participate in at least one organization during their time at the Academy. As of 2021, Mount Pisgah Academy offered the following organizations:

 Acrosports
 San Cielo (a touring choir)
 Hand Bell Choir
 Varsity Sports
 Yearbook

Spiritual aspects
All students take religion classes each year that they are enrolled. These classes cover topics in biblical history and Christian and denominational doctrines. Instructors in other disciplines also begin each class period with prayer or a short devotional thought, many which encourage student input. Weekly, the entire student body gathers together in the auditorium for an hour-long chapel service. Outside the classroom, there is year-round spiritually-oriented programming that relies on student involvement.

See also

 List of Seventh-day Adventist secondary schools
 Seventh-day Adventist education

References

External links
 
 Photo circa 1924 of Pisgah Industrial Institute, Seventh Day Adventist Church, Online Document Archive

Adventist secondary schools in the United States
Schools in Buncombe County, North Carolina
Private high schools in North Carolina